= Quality and Reliability Engineering International =

American academic journal

- Discipline: Engineering
- Language: English
- Edited by: Aarnout C. Brombacher, Douglas C. Montgomery and Loon Ching Tang

Publication details
- History: 1985—present
- Publisher: John Wiley & Sons
- Frequency: 8/year
- Open access: Hybrid
- Impact factor: 2.8 (2024)

Standard abbreviations
- ISO 4: Qual. Reliab. Eng. Int.

Indexing
- ISSN: 0748-8017 (print); 1099-1638 (web)

Links
- Journal homepage

Quality and Reliability Engineering International is a scientific journal focusing on engineering quality and reliability. This includes the quality and reliability of components, equipment, and physics of failure. It covers the fields of electrical, mechanical, and systems engineering
